Paul-Edmond Gagnon (20 January 1909 – 23 October 1981) was an independent member of the House of Commons of Canada. Born in Saint-Alexis-de-la-Grande-Baie, Quebec, he was a merchant by career.

Gagnon was educated at the Chicoutimi Seminary. He was also a member of the Knights of Columbus and the Saint-Jean-Baptiste Society.

He was first elected to Parliament at the Chicoutimi riding in the 1945 general election then re-elected for successive terms in 1949 and 1953. Gagnon was defeated by Rosaire Gauthier of the Liberal party.

References

External links
 

1909 births
1981 deaths
Canadian merchants
Independent MPs in the Canadian House of Commons
Members of the House of Commons of Canada from Quebec
Politicians from Saguenay, Quebec